Dillwynia phylicoides, commonly known as small-leaf parrot-pea, is a species of flowering plant in the family Fabaceae and is endemic to eastern Australia. It is an erect to open shrub with twisted, linear to narrow oblong leaves, and yellow and red flowers.

Description
The wings are yellow and red and shorter than the standard, and the keel is orange to purplish-brown.

Taxonomy
Dillwynia phylicoides was formally described in 1825 by botanist Allan Cunningham in Barron Field's Geographical Memoirs on New South Wales based on plant material he collected from hills near Bathurst. The specific epithet (phylicoides) means "Phylica-like".

Distribution and habitat
Small-leaf parrot-pea occurs in dry forest and woodland in Queensland, on the tablelands of New South Wales and the Australian Capital Territory, and in eastern inland Victoria.

References 

phylicoides
Fabales of Australia
Flora of New South Wales
Flora of Queensland
Flora of the Australian Capital Territory
Flora of Victoria (Australia)